The Nauru national badminton team represents Nauru in international badminton team competitions. It is administered by the Nauru Badminton Association, the governing body for badminton in Nauru. The Nauruan team first competed in the 2014 Oceania Badminton Championships mixed team event.

Participation in Oceania Badminton Championships 

Mixed team

Current squad 

Men
Image Declan Capelle
Ronson Dedemaro Cook

Women
Ruth Bagaga
Zoshka Dorothy Detenamo

References 

Badminton
National badminton teams